Gomphillus is a genus of lichens within the Gomphillaceae family.

References

Ostropales
Lichen genera
Ostropales genera
Taxa named by William Nylander (botanist)